Tioga Terrace is a neighborhood and census-designated place (CDP) in the town of Owego, Tioga County, New York, United States. It was first listed as a CDP prior to the 2020 census.

The community is in southeastern Tioga County, on the eastern side of Owego. It is bordered to the east by the town of Vestal in Broome County, to the west by the hamlet of Apalachin, and to the north by New York State Route 434 in the valley of the Susquehanna River. NY-434 leads east-northeast  to Binghamton and northwest  to the village of Owego. Interstate 86 runs parallel to NY-434, just to the north of the CDP, with the closest access from Exit 66 in Apalachin.

Demographics

References 

Census-designated places in Tioga County, New York
Census-designated places in New York (state)